Viscount Knollys, of Caversham in the County of Oxford, is a title in the Peerage of the United Kingdom. It was created in 1911 for the court official Francis Knollys, 1st Baron Knollys, Private Secretary to the Sovereign from 1901 to 1913. He had been previously created Baron Knollys, of Caversham in the County of Oxford, on 21 July 1902. His son, the second Viscount, served as Governor of Bermuda.  the titles are held by the latter's son, the third Viscount, who succeeded in 1966. The third Viscountess Knollys (d. 2022) was a sister of Baron Farnham: she served as Vice Lord-Lieutenant of Norfolk.

The Viscounts Knollys are members of the prominent Knollys family (pronounced "Nohlz") and are descended in the senior male line from William Knollys, 1st Earl of Banbury. This earldom is considered to have become extinct on the first Earl's death but the extinction has been contested up to the present day. For more information on this, see the Earl of Banbury.

The family seat is Bramerton Grange, near Norwich, Norfolk.

Viscounts Knollys (1911)
Francis Knollys, 1st Viscount Knollys (1837–1924)
Edward George William Tyrwhitt Knollys, 2nd Viscount Knollys (1895–1966)
David Francis Dudley Knollys, 3rd Viscount Knollys (b. 1931)

Line of succession

 Francis Knollys, 1st Viscount Knollys (1837–1924)
 Edward Knollys, 2nd Viscount Knollys (1895–1966)
 David Knollys, 3rd Viscount Knollys (b. 1931)
 (1) Hon. Patrick Knollys (b. 1962)
 (2) Alexander Knollys (b. 2000)
 (3) Hon. Christopher Knollys (b. 1964)
 (4) Edmund Knollys (b. 2000)
 (5) Hon. Michael Knollys (b. 1968)

See also
Earl of Banbury
Knollys family
Knollys Baronets
Knowles baronets

References

External links

Viscountcies in the Peerage of the United Kingdom
Knollys family
People from South Norfolk (district)
Noble titles created in 1911